Yarrow (Achillea millefolium) is a plant in the family Asteraceae.

Yarrow may also refer to:
 Yarrow, other species within the genus Achillea

Places
 Yarrow, British Columbia, a community in Canada
 Yarrow, Northumberland, the location of the Kielder Reservoir dam
 Yarrow, Somerset, a hamlet in England
 River Yarrow (Lancashire), England
 Yarrow Reservoir, Lancashire, England
 Yarrow Water, Scotland
 Yarrow, Scottish Borders, Scotland
 Yarrow, Missouri, an unincorporated community in the United States

People with the name
 Yarrow Maaytey, 17th-century Somali ruler
 Alder Yarrow, American wine journalist and restaurant critic
 Alfred Yarrow (1842–1932), British shipbuilder
 Arnold Yarrow (born 1920), British actor
 Catherine Yarrow (1904–1990), British artist
 Eric Yarrow (1920–2018), British shipbuilder, son of Harold Yarrow
 Ernest Yarrow (1876–1939), British-American missionary
 Harold Yarrow (1884–1962), British shipbuilder, son of Alfred Yarrow
 H. C. Yarrow (1840–1929), American naturalist, ornithologist, and surgeon
 Peter Yarrow (born 1938), American singer and member of Peter, Paul and Mary

Arts, entertainment, and media
 Yarrow (novel), a novel by Charles de Lint
 Yarrowstalks, an underground publication from the 1960s and 1970s

Brands and enterprises
 Yarrow boiler, developed by Yarrow Shipbuilders and widely used in ships
 Yarrow Shipbuilders, in Glasgow, Scotland

Other uses
 Yarrow, a codename for the Fedora Core 1 Linux distribution
 Yarrow algorithm. a family of cryptographic pseudorandom number generators
 Yarrow baronets, a title in the Baronetage of the United Kingdom 
 Yarrow Stadium, Westown, New Zealand
 Yarrow sticks method, an approach to I Ching divination
 USS Yarrow (SP-1010), a United States Navy patrol boat

See also
 Jarrow, a town in Tyne and Wear, England